The Sonntagskreis ("Sunday Circle") was an intellectual discussion group in Budapest, Hungary, between 1915 and 1918. The main focus of the group was on the relationship between ideas and the social and historical context of those ideas, a line of thought that led towards the later concepts of "social history of art" and "sociology of knowledge".

The Sonntagskreis group 

The Sonntagskreis was founded in the autumn of 1915 by Béla Balázs, Lajos Fülep, Arnold Hauser, György Lukács, and Károly (Karl) Mannheim; in December of that year Balázs noted the success of the group in his diary. Others members of the group at various times included Frigyes (Frederick) Antal, Béla Fogarasi, Tibor Gergely, Edit Gyömrői, Edit Hajós, Anna Lesznai, Mihály (Michael) Polányi, László Radványi, Emma Ritoók, Anna Schlamadinger, Ervin Šinko, Vilmos Szilasi, Károly Tolnay (Charles de Tolnay) and János (Johannes) Wilde. Admission to the group required the assent of all existing members; members could bring guests to meetings. The group generally met on Sunday afternoons at Balázs's flat, and discussed literature and philosophy.

The Free School of Humanist Studies 

Guest lecturers included Béla Bartók, Zoltán Kodály and Ervin Szabó.

References

Further reading

 Zoltán Novák (1979) A Vasárnap Társaság. Budapest: Kossuth Könyvkiadó,  (in Hungarian)
 Éva Karádi, Erzsébet Vezér (1980) A Vasárnapi Kör: dokumentumok. Budapest: Gondolat, 1980.  (in Hungarian)
 Éva Karádi and Erzsébet Vezér; Albrecht Friedrich (trans.) (1985) Georg Lukacs, Karl Mannheim und der Sontntagskreis. Frankfurt am Main: Sendler Verlag,  (German translation of A Vasárnapi Kör)
 Anna Wessely (1975) "A Szellemi Tudományok Szabad Iskolájána es a Vasärnapi Kör" (The Free School of Humanist Studies and the Sunday Circle). Világosság 16(10): 613–20 (in Hungarian)

20th-century philosophy
Hungarian sociologists
Hungarian artists
Hungarian philosophers
Hungarian writers
Philosophical schools and traditions
Literary circles